St Margaret's Hospital is a hospital in Epping, Essex. It is managed by the Princess Alexandra Hospital NHS Trust.

History
The hospital has its origins in the Epping Union Workhouse Infirmary built in 1846. New infirmary buildings were constructed in 1876, in the 1880s and again in 1911. The site became the Epping Institution in 1930 and St. Margaret's Hospital in 1938.

On 22 March 1945 the hospital was hit by a German V-2 rocket, which destroyed the water tower, flooding nearby houses. 7 men were killed. Some houses, the elderly unit and the laundry block at the hospital and a single storey timber built casual ward were destroyed. The hospital joined the National Health Service in 1948 and the workhouse building itself was demolished in 2001.

See also
 Healthcare in Essex
 List of hospitals in England

References

Hospitals in Essex
NHS hospitals in England
Epping, Essex